The New Democratic Party fielded thirteen candidates in the 1970 Quebec provincial election, none of whom were elected. Information about these candidates may be found on this page.

Electoral divisions

References

1970